Mountain pink is a common name for several plants and may refer to:
Dianthus armeria, native to Europe
Zeltnera beyrichii, native to the Americas